Sanvav is a village (or panchayat) in the Gir Gadhada Taluka of Gir Somnath district in Gujarat, India. Until August 2013, it was part of Una Taluka and the Junagadh district. It is at latitude 20.891855 and longitude 70.909792.

Demographics 
At the 2011 Indian census, Sanvav's population was 4,687 in 843 families, with 2,422 males and 2,265 females.

Most of Sanvav's residents are dependent on agriculture. The effective literacy rate (excluding children aged 6 and below) is 65.98%

List of Villages in Gir Gadhada Taluka
Below is the Revenue records list of forty-three villages of Gir Gadhada Taluka including Gir Gadhada village.

Ambavad
Ankolali
Babariya
Bediya
Bhakha
Bhiyal
Bodidar
Dhokadva
Dhrabavad
Dron
Fareda
Fatsar
Fulka
Gir Gadhada
Harmadiya
Itvaya
Jamvala
Jaragli
Jhanjhariya
Jhudvadli
Juna Ugla
Kanakiya
Kaneri
Kansariya
Khilavad
Kodiya
Mahobatpara
Motisar
Nagadiya
Nava Ugla
Nitli
Panderi
Rasulpara
Sanosri
Sanvav
Sonariya
Sonpura
Thordi
Umedpara
Undari
Vadli
Vadviyala
Velakot

References 

Villages in Gir Gadhada Taluka
Villages in Gir Somnath district